The Bucks County Playhouse is located in New Hope, Pennsylvania.

When the Hope Mills burned in 1790, the grist mills were rebuilt as the New Hope Mills, by Benjamin Parry. The town was renamed for the mills.

The building was saved from demolition in the 1930s purchased and run, by a group including playwrights Moss Hart and Kenyon Nicholson. Renovations converting the building into a theatre began in 1938. The first show opened there on July 1 1939, Springtime for Henry featuring Edward Everett Horton.

The Bucks County Playhouse became a summer theater. It was the starting point for many actors and became a place where plays slated for Broadway were tried out. Neil Simon's Barefoot in the Park had its premiere at the theater in 1963, starring Robert Redford and Elizabeth Ashley. Other notable actors who performed at the theater over the years include Bela Lugosi, Dick Van Dyke, Tyne Daly, Grace Kelly, Angela Lansbury, and Walter Matthau.

The Bucks County Playhouse Conservancy, a public/private partnership, raised sufficient funds to regain the property following a 2010 foreclosure. Following an extensive renovation, the theater reopened on July 2, 2012.

Memorable productions

July 1, 1939: 
Bucks County Playhouse opening night- Springtime for Henry starring Edward Everett Horton.

1941: 
Hume Cronyn starring in Clifford Odets’ Golden Boy. 
The Man Who Came to Dinner, starring George S. Kaufman, Moss Hart and Harpo Marx (who actually spoke!), a memorable production from BCP producers Theron and Phyllis Bamberger

1946: 
Helen Hayes (and 16-year-old daughter Mary MacArthur who made her stage debut as a BCP Apprentice) appeared in James M. Barrie's Alice Sit-by-the-Fire.

1949: 
BCP Apprentice Grace Kelly makes her stage debut in playwright George Kelly's The Torchbearers, followed by The Heiress.

1951: 
Jessica Tandy and Hume Cronyn star together for the first time on stage in the pre-Broadway opening of The Fourposter.

1952: 
Angela Lansbury graced the BCP stage in Affairs of State.
Grace Kelly returned to the BCP, fresh from Broadway, television and Hollywood to star with Jerome Cowen in Accent on Youth.

1955: 
The Today Show broadcast live, with host Dave Garoway, from the BCP with an NBC radio simulcast which had never been done before in the US. It was national recognition for the Bucks County Playhouse.

1959: 
Dick Van Dyke's first dramatic stage appearance in BCP's Cradle and All and Robert Redford's first role at BCP in Tiger at the Gates.

1960: 
Come Blow Your Horn was Neil Simon's first play and made its world premiere at the BCP. Producers Michael Ellis and William Hammerstein, after Simon's rewrites, took Come Blow Your Horn from BCP to Broadway.

1963: 
Barefoot in the Park (Nobody Loves Me), Neil Simon's third play, had its premiere at the theater starring Robert Redford and Elizabeth Ashley. It was the first play that Mike Nichols ever directed which also led to his first Tony Award for Best Director (Dramatic) on Broadway in 1964. 
James Daly and his family, seventeen-year-old Tyne, fifteen-year-old daughter Glynn and seven-year-old son Tim all appeared together in playwright Jean Kerr's first comedy, Jenny Kissed Me, in 1963. James Daly first starred in 1954's Millicent's Castle and later in the 1962 hit The Advocate at the BCP. Tyne Daly started her career by performing in summer stock with her family, earned her Equity Card at age 15, and made her professional debut at the BCP.
Alan Alda appeared in Jean Kerr's King of Hearts, directed by James Hammerstein.

1964: 
Liza Minnelli stars in Time Out For Ginger by Ronald Alexander with Chester Morris.
BCP Apprentice Rob Reiner worked on Sunday In New York (starring Alan Alda & Sherry Lewis), Bus Stop (starring Johnnie Ray), The Choice is Murder, Broadway (starring Merv Griffin), and A Perfect Frenzy by John D. Hess (starring Shelley Berman)
The entire US and Canada heard all about the little town of New Hope, PA when The Arthur Godfrey Show, on CBS radio, originated from the stage of the BCP for two weeks while Mr. Godfrey starred in a revival of Thornton Wilder's Our Town.

1965:
James Daly and Colleen Dewhurst star in Who's Afraid of Virginia Wolf. Also co-starring Danial J. Travanti. Rob Reiner was a BCP Apprentice this entire season.
Eddie Bracken and Doddie Goodman star in The Thurber Carnival. Timmy Brown, Nancy Nuegent, David Doyle, & Margaret Hamilton co-star.

1966: 
George C. Scott and Colleen Dewhurst star in The Lion in Winter
Bernadette Peters appeared in Riverwind, starring Robert Alda, directed by James Hammerstein.

1970: 
John Lithgow Directed and/or acted in 4 shows at BCP: Sir in The Roar of the Greasepaint, the Smell of the Crowd, Dr. Talacryn in Hadrian VII and Captain Vale in The Magistrate (which he also directed). Mr. Lithgow even directed a BCP revival of Barefoot in the Park in 1970 right before heading off to the bright lights of Broadway!

1974: 
Give ‘Em Hell Harry, world premiere starring James Whitmore- went on to Ford's Theatre in Washington, DC.

1976: 
Anne Jackson and Eli Wallach's two-week run of The House of Blue Leaves broke the Playhouse's attendance record. Ms. Jackson starred in Dear Ruth, under the direction of Theron Bamberger, which provided the biggest profit in the 1947 season, and S.J. Behrman's witty comedy of the thirties, Biography, during the tenure of producer Walter Perner Jr. in 1966.

1989: 
Audra McDonald garners rave reviews as Aldonza in BCP's Man of La Mancha.

2012: 
Actor's Equity shows return to the BCP with Producing Director Jed Bernstein.
Rodgers and Hammerstein's A Grand Night for Singing, directed by Lonny Price, starring Courtney Balan, Ron Bohmer, Greg Bosworth, Erin Davie and Kenita R. Miller
Barefoot in the Park, directed by Sheryl Kaller, starring Robert John Biedermann, Candy Buckley, Jonathan Hadary, Lee Aaron Rosen and Virginia Veale
It's a Wonderful Life: A Live Radio Play, directed by Gordon Greenberg, starring Justin Guarini, Garth Kravits, Lauren Molina, Jill Paice, Kevin Pariseau, and Mark Price

References

 
Bucks County Playhouse Gets New Lease on Life
The curtain rises Monday at the refurbished Bucks County Playhouse

External links

Official website
https://web.archive.org/web/20120308160327/http://www.buckscountyherald.com/playhouse/page1.html

Theatres in Pennsylvania
Buildings and structures in Bucks County, Pennsylvania
Tourist attractions in Bucks County, Pennsylvania